Sun Wensheng (born 1942) is a People's Republic of China politician. He was born in Weihai, Shandong. He was vice governor and governor of Shanxi from 1994 to 1998.

References

1942 births
People's Republic of China politicians from Shandong
Chinese Communist Party politicians from Shandong
Vice-governors of Shanxi
Governors of Shanxi
Living people